The Capture of Guam was a bloodless engagement between the United States and Spain during the Spanish–American War. The U.S. Navy sent a single cruiser, to capture the island of Guam, then under Spanish control. However, the Spanish garrison on the island had no knowledge of the war and no real ability to resist the American forces. They surrendered without resistance and the island passed into American control. The event was the only conflict of the Spanish–American War on Guam.

Background
Guam had been under Spanish control since 1668. By the time of the war, however, Guam had been neglected and there was only a small Spanish military presence. The last message the authorities on Guam had received from Spain was dated April 14, 1898, a month before war was declared. Henry Glass, captain of the cruiser Charleston, was en route from California to Manila when in Honolulu he was joined by three transport ships, City of Peking, City of Sydney, and Australia. The transport carried the following military units:

After leaving Honolulu, Glass opened his sealed orders that read,
Upon the receipt of this order, which is forwarded by the steamship 'City of Pekin' to you at Honolulu, you will proceed, with the 'Charleston' and the 'City of Pekin' in company, to Manila, Philippine Islands. On your way, you are hereby directed to stop at the Spanish Island of Guam. You will use such force as may be necessary to capture the port of Guam, making prisoners of the governor and other officials and any armed force that may be there. You will also destroy any fortifications on said island and any Spanish naval vessels that may be there, or in the immediate vicinity. These operations at the Island of Guam should be very brief, and should not occupy more than one or two days. Should you find any coal at the Island of Guam, you will make such use of it as you consider desirable.
It is left to your discretion whether or not you destroy it. From the Island of Guam, proceed to Manila and report to Rear-Admiral George Dewey, U.S.N., for duty in the squadron under his command.

The message created intense excitement and enthusiasm amongst the American sailors. Many of them immediately went to the ship's library and eagerly scrutinized charts, geographies, histories, and encyclopaedias for information. While the sailors were in the ship's library learning information about the island of Guam, Captain Glass altered the direction of the cruiser towards the new destination. The sailors on the transports were stirred when they noticed the change in direction, and rumors started instantly. Some thought the expedition was to hoist the American flag over the Caroline Islands and remain there until reinforcements arrived for a stronger descent upon Manila. Others guessed that the Charleston was sailing to some mysterious Spanish island, complete with impregnable fortifications, a formidable force of Spanish soldiers, and vast quantities of coal. The rumors stopped the next day, when the expeditions's objectives were wigwagged to the transports.

Along with the sealed orders were warnings of possible Spanish man of wars in San Luis d'Apra, the main port of Guam, and notification of it being protected by a heavy battery of guns. The existence of the powerful coastal defences were verified by reputable travelers who had visited the island within 1896 or 1895. Definite information of the size of the Spanish garrison was not given, and in the absence of direct knowledge, the captain of the cruiser had to assume that there might be more than a thousand fighting men on the island who were thoroughly familiar with the terrain. Glass held a conference on the Australia, and invited General Anderson, Commander William C. Gibson, naval officer in charge of the transports, and the captains of the three troop carriers were invited to participate in the discussions. Also present at the meeting was T. A. Hallet, third officer of Australia and a former whaling captain, who had been to the Mariana Islands many times. Hallet told the group that on his last visit to Guam, San Luis d'Apra was strongly fortified. Fort Santa Cruz and the battery on Point Orote, he stated, were efficiently manned and equipped. After a complete appraisal of all the known and unknown factors in the impending battle, the officers completed the arrangements for the attack on Guam.

It was soon noticed by the troops that the Charleston expected a fight, since the cruiser began firing subcaliber ammunition at boxes tossed from the City of Peking. This mild training continued until the afternoon of June 15, when the American cruiser started circling and firing service charges at pyramidal cloth targets set adrift from the cruiser herself. By the time the convoy crossed the 180th meridian, the officers and men felt they were ready for the enemy.

Capture
On June 20, Captain Glass arrived off the shore of Guam, and he noticed that the only ship in the harbor was a Japanese ship that was trading copra. Many of the men on USS Charleston were disappointed that there were no Spanish ships to engage.

As the cruiser proceeded on its way, a small group of curious inhabitants gathered on the shores of Piti, a landing place down the bay. These locals were aware of the presence of the American vessels, for they had been sighted early that morning. All of the important citizens of Guam were there with the exception of the governor, Don Juan Marina. The chief officials present were a lieutenant commander of the navy and captain of the port, Don Francisco Gutiérrez, Don José Romero, naval surgeon, and Captain Pedro Duarte Andurra of the marine corps, and José Sixto, civil paymaster. Among the prominent civilians at the beach were Francisco Portusach, the leading merchant of Guam, and his brother José Portusach. While the gathering was looking curiously at the cruiser and the three transports, Charleston fired 13 rounds at the old Spanish fortress from three of her guns. There was no return fire, and there was no apparent damage to the fort. The captain of the port, the naval surgeon, and a native Chamorro named José Paloma got into a boat furnished by Francisco Portusach and went out to welcome the visitors. José Portusach went along with the party to act as interpreter. When they finally got aboard the deck of Charleston, Glass immediately informed them that war had been declared between the U.S. and Spain.

The Spanish officials were amazed when they heard this and the news that they were now prisoners of war, because no dispatches or mail had arrived since April 9 to enlighten them. They were then paroled for the day when they promised to return to Agana to inform the governor of the war and notify him to appear on board the American ship immediately. The party then went below deck into the captain's cabin to discuss the surrender of the island.

As they were going below, Francisco Portusach sailed across the bow of the Charleston in a whaleboat with the American flag at the topmast. A loud voice from the ship called, "Frank, come on board." Portusach looked up to the deck and saw Captain Hallett, a man whom he had known years before. The skipper of the whaleboat then went to the lee side of the cruiser and clambered aboard. When he reached the deck, he was surprised to find a reporter with whom he was acquainted, a representative of the San Francisco Chronicle. While the reporter and the old whaling captain were talking about old times, Lieutenant William Braunersreuther, the navigator, walked up to Portusach and demanded to know by what right he was hoisting the American flag at the topmast of the little boat. The Guam merchant merely grinned and replied the flag was being flown legally. The lieutenant promptly requested proof and Portusach produced American naturalization papers from an inside coat pocket and handed them to the doubting Braunersreuther who looked at them and said, "Well! Twenty-second of October, 1888, Chicago, Cook County, State of Illinois." The navigator examined the document more thoroughly and requested Portusach to accompany him to visit Glass. The "welcoming party" had just departed for shore, so the two men entered the captain's cabin, and the lieutenant handed the naturalization papers to Glass who looked at them for a few moments. He had already heard from José Portusach that Francisco possessed some lighters and boats, so he greeted the merchant by inquiring if it was possible to obtain the use of two lighters and a boat to transfer coal from City of Peking to the bunkers of Charleston and offered to pay for the service. Portusach agreed to furnish the boats without compensation since he felt an obligation, as the only United States citizen on the island, to aid his country in time of war.

Francisco Portusach returned to Piti where his brother was waiting for him, and was informed that the Spanish officers were under arrest, but had been paroled with the understanding that they would deliver themselves on board Charleston so they might be taken to Manila as prisoners of war. Francisco then ordered his head boatman, Tiburcio de los Santos, and several of his men to deliver the lighters and boats to Charleston early in the morning. The two brothers got into their buggy and started for Agana. On the road home they met several soldiers who were struggling with two small artillery pieces which had been turned back by Captain Duarte since it was not necessary to salute the American cruiser.

When they arrived home, a letter was waiting for Francisco from Governor Marina which said: "If you give any assistance to the American men of war, you will be executed tomorrow morning at the beach." After reading the note, Guam's leading merchant laughed. His wife, an American woman he had married in San Francisco, asked what was in the message, and became apprehensive when he told her. Jose warned him to be careful, especially when he learned that boats had already been promised to the Americans. His brother replied that the boats would be delivered in the morning regardless of the threatening message.

Later that afternoon, Francisco Portusach, despite the display of bravado, was worried, so he returned to Charleston with the threatening note from Marina and showed it to Glass. They had conferred less than half an hour when the governor's secretary came back to the cruiser with a letter which said:
Agana, June 20, 1898. 
Mr. Henry Glass, 
Captain of the North American Cruiser Charleston: 
By the captain of the port in which you have cast anchor I have been courteously requested, as a soldier, and, above all, as a gentleman, to hold a conference with you, adding that you have advised him that war has been declared between our respective nations, and that you have come for the purpose of occupying these Spanish islands.

It would give me great pleasure to comply with his request and see you personally, but, as the military laws of my country prohibit me from going on board a foreign vessel, I regret to have to decline this honor and to ask that you will kindly come on shore, where I await you to accede to your wishes as far as possible, and to agree as to our mutual situations. Asking your pardon for the trouble I cause you, I guarantee your safe return to your ship.

Very respectfully, 
JUAN MARINA 
The Governor 

By this time, Glass suspected that the governor was perpetrating a trick. An ultimatum was prepared for delivery to the governor of Guam and arrangements were made for a presentation of it on the following morning. At 08:00 the next morning, Lieutenant Braunersreuther was waiting to take command of a landing party composed of the Marine guard of Charleston, the Marines from City of Peking, and two companies of the Oregon volunteer regiment on Australia. He had specific instructions to go ashore and capture the governor, his officers, and any armed forces on the island.

The men had difficulty in getting the boats ready, so the lieutenant left without them in a small boat, merely taking with him Ensign Waldo Evans, four sailors, and two newspaper reporters, Douglas White and Sol Sheridan. He landed at the harbor of Piti under a flag of truce and there he was met by Governor Marina and his staff. After formal introduction, Braunersreuther handed the governor this ultimatum from Captain Glass: "Sir: In reply to your communication of this date I have now, in compliance with the orders of my government, to demand the immediate surrender of the defenses of the Island of Guam, with arms of all kinds, all officials and persons in the military service of Spain now in this island. This communication will be handed you tomorrow morning by an officer who is ordered to wait not over one half hour for your reply."

Then Braunersreuther called the governor's attention to the fact that only 30 minutes were allowed for a reply, and casually reminded him of the three transports loaded with troops and the formidable war vessel in the harbor. Marina and his advisers went into a nearby boatshed for consultation. Twenty-nine minutes later, they reappeared and handed the lieutenant a sealed envelope addressed to the commanding officer of Charleston. The captain's emissary, amid vigorous protestations from the governor, broke the seal and read the message which contained a notification of the surrender of the island of Guam. He then said, "Gentlemen, you are now my prisoners; you will have to repair on board the Charleston with me."

The governor protested, claiming that he had not expected such action. He accused the lieutenant of treachery, as the Americans had come ashore under a flag of truce, before making the Spaniards prisoners of war. Braunersreuther replied that he had merely been instructed to deliver a letter and since he was now in possession of an offer of complete surrender, the Americans were permitted to make any demand they wished. The Spanish officials were allowed to write letters to their families. Afterward, Marina and his staff were taken to City of Sydney after sending an order to Agana for the Spanish soldiery and native militia to be at Piti landing no later than four o'clock that afternoon.

Braunsreuther then returned to the ships, obtained the marine guard, and returned to shore. There, according to agreement, the Spanish soldiers were lined up awaiting surrender. Lieutenant John Twiggs Myers, later known for his command during the Boxer Rebellion, marched the Marines through the boathouse and lined them up so that the Spanish and native troops were between the Americans and the ocean. The 54 Spanish regulars and two lieutenants were disarmed, placed in a sampan, and transported to City of Sydney.

Aftermath
Glass went ashore and raised an American flag over the fortifications while the bands aboard Australia and City of Peking played "The Star-Spangled Banner". His orders included destroying the island's forts, but Glass decided that they were in such disrepair that he left them as they were.

Francisco Portusach and his workers finally completed transferring the coal from City of Peking to Charleston on June 22. Afterward, Glass took him to his cabin, and appointed him Governor of the island, until the arrival of proper American authority. After saying goodbye to the natives, Charleston and the three transports left the harbor at 16:00, and later joined George Dewey's fleet at Manila.

Notes

References

An encyclopedia.
 
 
 
 Chronology for the Philippine Islands and Guam in the Spanish–American War, Library of Congress

Guam (1898), Battle of
Guam (1898), Battle of
History of Guam
Conflicts in 1898
1898 in Guam
Guam
United States Navy in the 19th century
Articles containing video clips
June 1898 events
Military in Guam